John Stephen Piper (born January 11, 1946) is an American New Testament scholar, Baptist theologian, pastor, and chancellor of Bethlehem College & Seminary in Minneapolis, Minnesota. Piper taught biblical studies at Bethel University for six years (1974–1980), before serving as pastor for preaching and vision of Bethlehem Baptist Church (Converge) in Minneapolis for 33 years (1980–2013).

Piper is the founder and senior teacher of desiringGod.org, named for his book Desiring God: Meditations of a Christian Hedonist (1986), and has written a number of award-winning books, including ECPA Christian Book Award winners Spectacular Sins, What Jesus Demands from the World, Pierced by the Word, and God's Passion for His Glory, as well as bestsellers Don't Waste Your Life and The Passion of Jesus Christ.

Biography
Piper was born on January 11, 1946, in Chattanooga, Tennessee, to Bill and Ruth Piper. His father was a traveling evangelist for over 60 years. Before Piper was one year old, his family moved to Greenville, South Carolina, where he spent the remainder of his youth, graduating from Wade Hampton High School in 1964.

According to Piper, he had a religious conversion at his mother's knee while on a family vacation in Florida when he was six years old. Piper has remarked that the fact he was converted at the age of six "blows him away", not because he remembers the event, but due to his belief in the Bible's telling of the hopeless condition of all humans who have not been converted.

Piper married Noël Henry in December 1968, and together they had four sons, a daughter, and twelve grandchildren. He studied at Wheaton College between 1964 and 1968, majoring in literature and minoring in philosophy.Studying romantic literature with Clyde Kilby led him to take particular interest in poetry, Piper has published several books of poetry, and continues to pursue, with his poetry, the deeper reality of personal, theological  and social  reality. He has explained in both prose and poetry why he writes. C.S. Lewis has remained a profound influence in Piper's life, in large measure, he says, because of the "combination of rational precision with language, and profound poetic perception of reality."

In the fall of 1966, Piper caught mononucleosis, and during this infection, he listened to the Pastor Harold John Ockenga on WETN, his college's radio station. Piper dated his call to the ministry of God’s word to that experience, stating, “I can remember listening there on my bed to his messages on the radio and feeling inside my heart simply explode with longing to be able to handle the word of God the way he was handling it in the pulpit at Edman Chapel. Before those three weeks were over, I had resolved to drop organic chemistry…  That was, I believe, my call to the ministry of the word.”

But the most formative season theologically was yet to come: three years under the tutelage of Daniel Payton Fuller, at Fuller Theological Seminary in Pasadena, California, from 1968 to 1971. Fuller’s influence on Piper was, he admits with thankfulness, enormous. Three things that would mark Piper’s life-work are traceable to that influence: assiduous attention to exegetical detail in Bible study (indeed in all reading), a central conviction of the all-embracing sovereignty of God, and what Piper came to call Christian Hedonism.

Piper received his Doctor of Theology degree in New Testament studies at the University of Munich, Germany (1971–1974) under Leonhard Goppelt. His dissertation, Love Your Enemies, was published by Cambridge University Press and Baker Book House. Upon completion of his doctorate, Piper taught biblical studies at Bethel University in Saint Paul, Minnesota, for six years between 1974 and 1980.

Piper's mother died on December 16, 1974 in a bus wreck in Israel. Following this incident in 1990, a tribute to her was included in Piper's booklet What's the Difference?.

Ministry

In 1980, Piper became pastor of Bethlehem Baptist Church in Minneapolis, Minnesota, where he ministered until March 31, 2013 as pastor for preaching and vision. Piper became involved in evangelical Christianity following the publication of his book Desiring God: Meditations of a Christian Hedonist in 1986, and has continued to publish dozens of books further articulating his theological perspective. In 1994, Piper founded Desiring God Ministries, with the aim of "spread[ing] a passion for the supremacy of God in all things for the joy of all peoples through Jesus Christ". Desiring God Ministries offers all of Piper's sermons and articles from the past three decades—and most of his books—online at no cost.

Piper took an eight month leave of absence from his ministry from May 1, 2010, to January 9, 2011. He announced in June 2011 that he would soon step down from his role of pastor. A candidate to succeed him was announced in March 2012, and on May 20, 2012, Jason Meyer was voted in (784 yes to 8 no) to be the next pastor for preaching & vision, replacing Piper.

On March 31, 2013 (Easter Sunday), Piper preached his final sermon as pastor of Bethlehem Baptist and announced in an open letter to the congregation that he and his family would be moving to Tennessee for at least a year, in order for the church's new leadership to develop a strategic vision for the church without distractions. He still attends the church and is designated pastor emeritus with no official role in the church leadership.

John Piper has sold millions of books but has donated 100% of the royalties from his books sales to various charities.

Recognition
In 2010, a Festschrift was published in his honor, entitled For the Fame of God's Name: Essays in Honor of John Piper, including contributions from Don Carson, Sinclair Ferguson, G. K. Beale, Thomas R. Schreiner, Wayne Grudem, Al Mohler, C. J. Mahaney, Mark Dever, John MacArthur, and Bill Mounce.

In 2018, he was named one of the 12 Most Effective Preachers in English by Baylor University.

Personal life 
He married Noël Henry in 1968 and had five children, including an adopted daughter. His son Abraham Piper has publicly criticized evangelical Christianity.

On January 11, 2006, Piper announced that he had been diagnosed with prostate cancer. According to a letter sent to his church, he and his doctors believed that the cancer was fully treatable. Piper responded to his diagnosis with the following:

Piper underwent successful surgery on February 14, 2006.

Books

External links 

 
 John Piper Biographical Sketch on Monergism.com

References

1946 births
20th-century Calvinist and Reformed theologians
21st-century Calvinist and Reformed theologians
American Calvinist and Reformed Christians
American Calvinist and Reformed ministers
American Calvinist and Reformed theologians
American Christian clergy
American evangelicals
American sermon writers
Baptist ministers from the United States
American Baptist theologians
Baptist writers
Bible commentators
Baptists from Tennessee
Bethel University (Minnesota) faculty
Fuller Theological Seminary alumni
Living people
Ludwig Maximilian University of Munich alumni
People from Chattanooga, Tennessee
Supersessionism
Wheaton College (Illinois) alumni
Writers from Greenville, South Carolina